Ptilopsis is a genus of typical owls, or true owls, in the family Strigidae, that inhabits Africa. Its members are:

References

 Barlow, Wacher and Disley, Birds of The Gambia 

 
Ptilopsis